Bee Mountain is a mountain in the North Carolina High Country and is wholly in the Pisgah National Forest.  Its elevation reaches .  The mountain generates feeder streams for the Catawba River.

It is one of the more isolated mountains in North Carolina, with only one road (Roseboro Road/SR1511) that remotely goes near it.

See also
List of mountains in North Carolina

References

Mountains of North Carolina
Mountains of Avery County, North Carolina
Pisgah National Forest